Viktor Pankrashkin (10 December 1957 - 24 July 1993) was a Soviet basketball player.

Pankrashkin won a gold medal at the 1988 Summer Olympics. Also, he won one silver and one bronze at the EuroBasket.

Club career
Pankrashkin only came to basketball at the age of 17.  Because of his height, he was noticed by an army basketball coach. After a short time with different army teams he came to CSKA Moscow, where he spent 10 years. In addition to his height, he had an enormous arm length so that he could stand on his heel and touch the basketball ring. With these physical virtues, blocked shots became his trademark. He won five Soviet championships in a row with CSKA. He celebrated his greatest triumph in 1988 when he won the gold medal at the 1988 Olympic Games in Seoul as a member of the Soviet national team. After 1988, CSKA got a new coach, with whom Pankraschkin fell out. He left Moscow and joined the new Armenian club Urartu in Yerevan. In terms of sport, however, his most successful period was over.

Disease
As early as 1986 Pankrashkin was diagnosed with tuberculosis. He initially kept the disease a secret. The further progression of the disease made it impossible to play basketball from 1992 onwards. He died of this disease on July 24, 1993.

References

External links 
 

1957 births
1993 deaths
Russian men's basketball players
Soviet men's basketball players
Olympic basketball players of the Soviet Union
Olympic gold medalists for the Soviet Union
Basketball players at the 1988 Summer Olympics
Olympic medalists in basketball
Medalists at the 1988 Summer Olympics